The 2006 Munster Senior Hurling Championship Final (sponsored by Guinness) was a hurling match played on Sunday 25 June 2006 at Semple Stadium, Thurles, County Tipperary,. It was contested by Cork and Tipperary. Cork captained by Pat Mulcahy claimed the title beating Tipperary on a scoreline of 2-14 to 1-14. The match was shown live in Ireland as part of the Sunday Game live on RTÉ Two.

Tipperary forward Lar Corbett got the opening goal of the game when he shot low to beat Cork goalkeeper Donal Óg Cusack in the fourth minute. Cusack went on to make two saves in the first half as the teams were level at half time.

Match details

References

External links
Match Highlights

Munster
Munster Senior Hurling Championship Finals
Cork county hurling team matches
Tipperary GAA matches